RTK 1 (English: Radio Television of Kosovo 1, Albanian: Radio Televizioni i Kosovës 1) is the first public television channel of Kosovo, providing general programming. As part of the Radio Television of Kosovo (RTK), a public service broadcaster, RTK 1 produces and airs newscasts, sports updates and talk shows of interest to Kosovo viewers. RTK 1 airs throughout the whole territory of Kosovo, as well as in Albania, North Macedonia, Montenegro, Slovenia, Germany and Switzerland.

History 
RTK 1 was founded a few weeks after the end of the NATO bombing of Yugoslavia, at the instigation of then United Nations Interim Administration Mission in Kosovo & the Organization for Security and Co-operation in Europe. Originally funded through contributions from international donors, this $3 Million Project, but it was also strongly supported by Bernard Kouchner, then senior UN Official in Kosovo.

In February 2008, RTK was made a national public service television. A few months later, the Director-General Agim Zatriqi abandons his functions at the head of the RTK, denouncing interferences of the ruling party in the management of the chain. These accusations were later taken up by the head of the European Broadcasting Union. Jean Réveillon, stated that "the pressure from the Kosovo government to transform the Kosovo Radio and Television into a radio-television of Non-critical state that will not be useful to citizens." RTK 1 also broadcasts political debates and broadcasts as well as sessions of the Kosovo Parliament. RTK 1 also used to broadcast programs in the other minority languages of Kosovo. After the launch of the 2nd public channel, RTK 2, which is supposed to air in all the minority languages of Kosovo, all the programs moved there.

References 

Television stations in Kosovo
1999 establishments in Kosovo
Albanian-language television stations
Television channels and stations established in 1999